Michael Amir Richardson (born 24 January 2002) is a French professional footballer who plays as a midfielder for Ligue 2 club Le Havre.

Club career 
Amir Richardson came through the ranks of OGC Nice youth system, before joining Le Havre.

He made his professional debut for Le Havre AC on the 15 May 2021, starting the Ligue 2 game against the league champions of  ESTAC Troyes. On 9 July 2021, he signed his first professional contract with Le Havre.

Personal life
Richardson is the son of the American former basketball player Micheal Ray Richardson and a French-Moroccan mother.

References

External links
 

2002 births
Living people
Footballers from Nice
French footballers
France youth international footballers
French people of African-American descent
French sportspeople of Moroccan descent
Association football midfielders
Le Havre AC players
Ligue 2 players